Vladimir Alekseyevich Ponomaryov (born 18 February 1940 in Moscow) is a retired Soviet football player.

International career
Ponomaryov made his debut for USSR on 11 October 1964 in a friendly against Austria. He played at the 1966 FIFA World Cup, where USSR made it to the semi-finals.

External links
  Profile

1940 births
Living people
Soviet footballers
Soviet Union international footballers
1966 FIFA World Cup players
PFC CSKA Moscow players
Russian footballers
FC Dynamo Moscow reserves players
Association football defenders
Association football forwards